Harry ClarkeDarkness in Light is a documentary film originally released in 2003 (Irish-language version titled Harry Clarke - Dorchadas i Solas).

Synopsis
Filmmaker John J Doherty traces the life and work of the Irish artist, book illustrator and stained glass artist Harry Clarke (1889–1931) with major contributions from his biographer Nicola Gordon Bowe as well as many stained glass artists, poets and historians. The film takes the artist's work in stained glass, which was mainly religious an ethereal, and in book illustration, which was mainly dark and fantastical, as the basis for its title and tells a story of talent, struggle, success and the censorship of his final masterpiece 'the Geneva Window'. Harry Clarke brought his expertise in working in fine decorative detail in glass to his book illustrations, most notably in the tales of Hans Christian Andersen and Edgar Allan Poe where he is compared to Aubrey Beardsley and which are featured in the film and paralleled with German Expressionist cinema of the time. The film was made in conjunction with the Irish Film Board and national broadcaster TG4.

Awards
This film won the Best Arts Documentary award at the 2004 Celtic International Film Festival.
This film won the Best Documentary award at the 2005 Worldwide International Fantasy Film Festival - Toronto

Sources
 Nicola Gordon Bowe. 1994. The Life and Work of Harry Clarke (Irish Academic Press)
 TG4  awards 2004
 Celtic Media Festival  awards 1980–2010

External links
 Harry Clarke - Darkness In Light  official site

2003 films
Irish documentary films
Documentary films about visual artists
History of glass
Edgar Allan Poe
Films set in the 1920s
Films shot in Florida
English-language Irish films
Irish-language films
Arts and Crafts movement
2003 documentary films
2000s English-language films